London Graduate School may refer to:

Kingston University#Faculty of Arts and Social Sciences, a humanities postgraduate school based on Kingston University at Kingston upon Thames, London, England, United Kingdom
New London Graduate School, a consortium of five partner universities (Anglia Ruskin University, Greenwich University, The University of East London, Middlesex University, and London South Bank University) in London, England, United Kingdom